Parkash Singh Badal (born 8 December 1927) is an Indian politician who was Chief Minister of Punjab state from 1970 to 1971, from 1977 to 1980, from 1997 to 2002, and from 2007 to 2017. He is also the patron of Shiromani Akali Dal (SAD), a Sikh-centered regional political party. He was the president of the party from 1995 to 2008, when he was replaced by his son Sukhbir Singh Badal. As the patron of SAD he exercises a strong influence on the Shiromani Gurdwara Parbandhak Committee and Delhi Sikh Gurdwara Management Committee. The Government of India awarded him the second-highest civilian award, Padma Vibhushan, in 2015.

Early life
Parkash Badal was born on 8 December 1927 in Abul Khurana, near Malout. He belongs to a Jat Sikh family. He graduated from the Forman Christian College in Lahore.

Political career
He started his political career in 1947. He was Sarpanch of the Village Badal and later Chairman of Block Samiti, Lambi before rising into Punjab politics. He was elected to Punjab Vidhan Sabha in 1957 for the first time from the Shiromani Akali Dal political party . He was re-elected in 1969, serving as Minister for Community Development, Panchayati Raj, Animal Husbandry, Dairying and Fisheries. He was Leader of Opposition in 1972, 1980 and 2002. He has been elected in Vidhan Sabha for a total of 10 times, in 1957 and in each election since 1969, except for the February 1992 election, in which he led a boycott of state elections by the Akalis. In 1997 elections he won from Lambi Assembly constituency and has been a consecutive winner in four terms. He was a union minister in Prime Minister Morarji Desai's government in 1977, serving as Minister of Agriculture and Irrigation.

Chief Minister of Punjab
He has served as Punjab Chief Minister for four terms, the first time in 1970 when he became the youngest chief minister of an Indian state. He completed his most recent term in March 2017.

First term
Badal first became Chief Minister of Punjab in March 1970 and headed a coalition government of Akali Dal - Sant Fateh Singh and Jana Sangh. In June 1970 Jana Sangh withdrew support from the Badal government over their difference about the place of Hindi in Punjab. Later, in early July, seven of Akali Dal (Sant) defected to rival Akali Dal headed by ex-CM Gurnam Singh. An early session of the assembly was called on 24 July to prove the majority of Badal's government. However, the motion of no confidence was not admitted due to lack of requisite support of one-fifth of MLAs. Congress decided to stay neutral and did not support the no-confidence motion.

Third term (1997-2002)

He became CM for the term 12 February 1997 – 26 February 2002.

Fourth term (2007–2012)

In the 2007 Punjab state election Shiromani Akali Dal-Bharatiya Janata Party coalition government won 67 out of 117 seats and Parkash Singh Badal was sworn in as Chief Minister for the fourth time. He held 10 portfolios, which included the ministries for Home, Housing & Urban Development, Excise & Taxation, Power, Personnel, General Administration, Vigilance, Employment, Legal & Legislative Affairs and NRIs Affairs. Badal launched many schemes such as free ambulance service, Talwandi Sabo thermal plant, etc. Through a new transportation policy, he reduced taxes on air-conditioned buses, making it less expensive for companies to operate luxury buses. This also increased profits of a bus company owned by his son, Sukhbir Singh Badal, which soared to 1.7 million U.S. dollars.

2012–2017

In the 2012 election, Shiromani Akali Dal and Bharatiya Janata Party combined won 68 seats out of 117, despite a tradition of anti-incumbency in Punjab. Badal again became the Chief Minister of Punjab on 14 March 2012 after being sworn in by the Governor of Punjab, Shivraj Patil. He is also the oldest chief minister ever and is the only person who has been both the youngest and the oldest chief minister of his state. In the 2012–2017 government he held the portfolios of Personnel, General Administration, Power, Cooperation, Science Technology, and Environment, Vigilance and Employment Generation.

FDI in India
Badal opposed FDI, and sided with political ally BJP.

Participation in Akali Movement
He was first detained in the Karnal jail in connection with Civil Liberties Agitation later under the Maintenance of Internal Security Act during the Indian Emergency. He was President of the Akali Dal from 1996 to 2008.

Award

Panth Ratan
On 11 December 2011, Badal was bestowed upon the title of Panth Rattan Fakhr-e-Qaum (literally "Jewel of the religion, pride of the community") by the Akal Takht. He was awarded this title at Golden Temple complex in the presence of Jathedars of all five Takhts in the form of a “siropa” (robe of honour), a sword and a silver plaque with inscription of the citation of Panth Rattan Fakhr-e-Qaum. Badal was awarded this title for his service towards the Sikh Panth by creating many memorials pertaining to Sikhism such as Virasat-e-Khalsa, besides being imprisoned for long time and having faced atrocities during various Akali movements.

This award was retracted by the Sikh Panth at Sarbat Khalsa on 10 November 2015 due to allegations of Civil Rights Violations and failure to recognize the oppression faced by the Sikhs of Punjab.

Many political Sikh organizations such as Dal Khalsa, Khalra Mission Organization, Punjab Human Rights Organization, Khalsa Panchayat and Niarye Khalsa Organization. Former SGPC secretary general Manjit Singh Calcutta argued that this award is given posthumously. In response, Akal Takht Jathedar Giani Gurbachan Singh cited the example of Master Tara Singh, who was given this award during his lifetime. Dal Khalsa leader Kanwar Pal Singh termed it sycophancy, as Badal indirectly controls SGPC.

Padma Vibhushan

Parkash Singh Badal (left) receiving Padma Vibhushan award from President of India Pranab Mukherjee (right) on 30 March 2015.

However he returned this award to support the 2020–2021 Indian farmers' protest on 3 December 2020.

SYL Canal issue
Ever since the Sutlej-Yamuna Link (SYL) issue came up in 1982, Punjab Chief Minister Parkash Singh Badal has been vocal in disapproving it and leading from the front in safeguarding the rights of Punjab's farmers. He has played a key role in ensuring that SYL should never become a reality and even got arrested for leading the ‘Nehar Roko Morcha’ in April 1982. He believes that successive Congress governments at the Centre have been doing "grave injustice" to the state forcing Punjab to share the water in the name of SYL Canal. Recently, under his leadership, Punjab government took a path-breaking decision of adopting the Punjab Sutlej Yamuna Link Canal (Transfer of Proprietary Rights) Bill, 2016 in the assembly. With this decision taken on 14 March 2016, the process of denotifying (and dismantling) the 121-km long Sutlej Yamuna Link Canal that was constructed in Punjab to carry water to Haryana has begun. Parkash Singh Badal has expressed candidly many times that Punjab doesn't have a single drop of spare water for anybody and Akali Dal is opposed to the agreement which it believed would rob the water of the state. Chief Minister Badal, in his latest move, has sent a cheque of Rs.390 crore back to Haryana Chief Minister Manohar Lal Khattar received from Haryana nearly four decades back.

Issues
Parkash Singh Badal along with his wife Surinder Kaur, son Sukhbir Singh and seven others were booked under various provisions of the Prevention of Corruption Act in 2003. After a seven-year-long case all accused were acquitted by a local court in Mohali in 2010 due to a lack of incriminating evidence. In 2007, 11 key witnesses retracted their statements before the Special Court set up in Ropar district.

Ghadar-e-Qaum Brand
On 10 November 2015, along with Avtar Makkar, Badal was branded as Ghadar-e-Qaum (meaning traitor to the faith) by a gathering of the Sikh community known as the "Sarbat Khalsa." This was due to his alleged role in the 1984 anti Sikh riots.

Personal life

In 1959, he married Surinder Kaur. The couple had two children, Sukhbir Singh Badal and Parneet Kaur, who is married to Adesh Pratap Singh Kairon. Surinder Kaur died in 2011 after a long illness due to cancer.
His younger brother Gurdas Singh Badal had also been in politics. His nephew Manpreet Singh Badal  served as Finance Minister of Punjab.

Electoral Performance

See also

Prakash Singh Badal ministry (1977–1980)
 Bathinda

References

|-

|-

|-

|-

|-

1927 births
Living people
Shiromani Akali Dal politicians
Chief Ministers of Punjab, India
India MPs 1977–1979
Punjab, India MLAs 2007–2012
Punjab, India MLAs 1957–1962
Punjab, India MLAs 1967–1972
Punjab, India MLAs 1972–1977
Punjab, India MLAs 1977–1980
Punjab, India MLAs 1980–1985
Punjab, India MLAs 2002–2007
Punjab, India MLAs 1997–2002
Punjab, India MLAs 2012–2017
Indian Sikhs
People from Sri Muktsar Sahib
Punjabi people
Lok Sabha members from Punjab, India
Indians imprisoned during the Emergency (India)
Leaders of the Opposition in Punjab, India
Chief ministers from Shiromani Akali Dal
Recipients of the Padma Vibhushan in public affairs
Agriculture Ministers of India
Members of the Cabinet of India
Forman Christian College alumni
India MPs 1971–1977
People from Faridkot district
Punjab, India MLAs 2017–2022